Agrococcus terreus is a Gram-positive strictly aerobic, and non-motile bacterium from the genus Agrococcus which has been isolated from forest soil from the Changbai mountains.

References

Microbacteriaceae
Bacteria described in 2010